Meesha is an Indian restaurant in Seattle's Fremont neighborhood, in the U.S. state of Washington.

The menu has included Amritsari fish (rockfish with cardamom and fenugreek), bukhara dal, butter chicken, kofta, pakoras, paneer (with tomato sauce, asparagus, and pickled onions), and Goan prawn curry, as well as cocktails and wine. In 2021, Jessica Voelker and Stefan Milne included the business in Conde Nast Traveler list of Seattle's 21 best restaurants. Additionally, Olivia Hall included Meesha in Time Out Seattle overview of the city's 21 best restaurants. In 2022 the Seattle Metropolitan included the business in an overview of the city's 100 best restaurants. Eater Seattle included Meesha in a 2022 list of "The 38 Essential Restaurants in Seattle".

Meesha started as a pop-up restaurant, and began operating as a brick and mortar business in November 2020, during the COVID-19 pandemic. Kricket Club has been described as Meesha's "upscale sibling" restaurant.

See also 

 List of Indian restaurants

References

External links
 

Asian restaurants in Seattle
Fremont, Seattle
Indian restaurants in the United States